is a Japanese manga series written and illustrated by Kōji Seo. It began serialization in Kodansha's Weekly Shōnen Magazine in February 2021, and has been compiled into nine volumes as of February 2023. An anime television series adaptation by Tezuka Productions is set to premiere in April 2023.

Plot
The series is set in Miura, Kanagawa, and follows Hayato Kasukabe, an orphan who moved to Tokyo for high school. After passing the exams for the University of Tokyo, he returns to Miura after the death of his grandmother, where he decides to close her struggling café Familia. There, he discovers that five women have been working at the café, and after seeing their struggles and learning of their bond with his grandmother, he decides to re-open the café.

Characters

The protagonist, he was orphaned at a young age after his parents died in an accident. He then lives with his grandmother, Sachiko Kasukabe, but leaves for Tokyo following an argument with her. Following her death, he decides to come home, initially to close down the café, but later on he decides to keep it open.

A 19-year old part-timer at Familia, who is studying at a fashion school. She has a tsundere personality. She has a twin sister named Kikka. She later goes overseas to France in order to study fashion.

An 17-year old part-timer at Familia and a high school student, she is skilled in karate. A running gag in the series is her wearing masks to prank her co-workers.

A 20-year old part-timer at Familia and a college student. She is the granddaughter of a famous Shōwa era actress, and used to be a popular child actress herself.

A 20-year old part-timer at Familia and Hayato's childhood friend. She is the daughter of a Michelin Star Chef who had studied under Sachiko Kasukabe.

A 19-year old part-timer at Familia, and a vocalist and guitarist of a band. She comes from a rich family, who disapproves of her singing career.

Hayato's grandmother, who took care of Hayato after he was orphaned. Her death before the start of the series is what brings Hayato back to Familia.

Media

Manga
The series is written and illustrated by Kōji Seo. It began serialization in Kodansha's Weekly Shōnen Magazine on February 17, 2021. The first tankōbon volume was released on May 17, 2021; as of February 17, 2023, the series has been compiled into nine volumes.

In September 2022, Kodansha USA announced that they licensed the series for an English digital release; the first volume was released on October 18.

Volume list

Anime
An anime television series adaptation was announced on September 8, 2022. The series is produced by Tezuka Productions and directed by Satoshi Kuwabara, with scripts written by Keiichirō Ōchi, character designs handled by Masatsune Noguchi, and music composed by Shu Kanematsu and Miki Sakurai. It is set to premiere on April 8, 2023, on the Super Animeism programming block on MBS and TBS.

References

External links
The Café Terrace and Its Goddesses official manga website at Pocket Shōnen Magazine 
The Café Terrace and Its Goddesses official anime website 
The Café Terrace and Its Goddesses on Twitter 

2021 manga
2023 anime television series debuts
Anime series based on manga
Animeism
Kodansha manga
Miura, Kanagawa
Romantic comedy anime and manga
Shōnen manga
Television shows set in Kanagawa Prefecture
Tezuka Productions